Martien is both a given name and a surname. Notable people with the name include:

Martien Houtkooper (1891–1961), Dutch footballer
Martien Kas (born 1966), Dutch neuroscientist
Martien Vreijsen (born 1955), Dutch footballer
Samuel W. Martien (1854–1946), American cotton planter and politician

Dutch masculine given names